This is a list of species of fauna (animals) that have been observed in the U.S. State of Oregon.

Amphibians

Caudata
Oregon slender salamander

Reptiles

Serpentes
California mountain kingsnake - Native to Oregon 
Common garter snake - Native to Oregon.
Common kingsnake Native to Oregon 
Gopher snake - Native to Oregon 
Ground snake - Owyhee River 
Night snake - Native to Oregon 
Northwestern garter snake - Native to Oregon 
Pacific rattlesnake- Native to Oregon 
Racer - Native to Oregon 
Ringneck snake - Native to Oregon 
Rubber boa - Native to Oregon 
Sharptail snake - Native to Oregon 
Striped whipsnake - Native to Oregon 
Western rattlesnake - Found in Eastern Oregon 
Western terrestrial garter snake - Native to Oregon

Testudines
Snapping turtle - Introduced into Oregon.
Western painted turtle - Native to Oregon.

Annelids

Haplotaxida
Oregon giant earthworm

Birds 
List of birds of Oregon

Crustaceans

Notostraca
Branchinecta lynchi - Also in California.
Lepidurus packardi - Mostly Californian, but found in Jackson County, Oregon as well.

Fish

Cypriniformes
Warner sucker - Also in California, Arizona, and Nevada.
Shortnose sucker - Also in California.
Lost River sucker - Also in California.
Modoc sucker - Also in California.

Acipenseriformes
Green sturgeon - Rogue River in Oregon.
White sturgeon - Umpqua River in Oregon.

Lamniformes
Common thresher - Oregon coast.
Great white shark - Oregon coast.
Basking shark - Oregon coast.

Rajiformes
Broad skate - Oregon coast.
Fine-spined skate - Oregon coast.
Pacific white skate - Oregon coast.
Roughtail skate - Oregon coast.
Deepsea skate - Oregon coast.
Sandpaper skate - Oregon coast.

Perciformes
Calico surfperch - Oregon coast.

Carcharhiniformes
Brown catshark - Oregon coast.

Scorpaeniformes
Mosshead sculpin - Oregon coast.
Pit sculpin - Goose lake, Drews creek, and Thomas Creeks.
Prickly sculpin - River drainages

Petromyzontidae
Pacific lamprey - Native to Oregon 
Lampetra ayresii - Native to Oregon 
Western brook lamprey - Native to Oregon

Insects

Odonata
Canada darner - Native to Oregon and common across America.
Paddle-tailed darner - Native to Oregon and common across America.
Shadow darner - Native to Oregon and common across America.
Common green darner - Native to Oregon and common across America.
Sooty dancer - Native to Oregon.
Paiute dancer - Native to Oregon.
River jewelwing - Native to Oregon and common across America.
Taiga bluet - Native to Oregon and common across America.

Orthoptera
Jerusalem cricket - Found in Central and Eastern Oregon in the desert regions.

Hymenoptera
Franklin's bumble bee - Found in Southern Oregon.

Mammals

Rodentia
Baird's shrew - Endemic to northwest Oregon.
Camas pocket gopher - occurs only in the Willamette Valley, endemic to northwest Oregon in the Northwestern United States.
Fog shrew - Also can be found in northern California.
Gray-tailed vole - Endemic to Oregon.
Pacific shrew - Endemic to western Oregon.
White-tailed antelope squirrel - Found in central, eastern, and south-eastern Oregon, the desert regions.
Mountain beaver - Found in Western Oregon.
California kangaroo rat - Found in the Sierra Nevada Mountains in Oregon.
Chisel-toothed kangaroo rat - Found in South Eastern Oregon.
Ord's kangaroo rat - Found in Eastern Central Oregon.

Chiroptera
Pallid bat - Native to Oregon and common in the western United States.

Cetartiodactyla
American bison - Regionally extinct.

Lagomorpha
Pygmy rabbit - North Eastern Oregon.

References

External links

Lists of fauna of Oregon

Natural history of Oregon